Pietermaritzburg Girls' High School (GHS) is a girls' high school, with a boarding establishment, situated in Pietermaritzburg, KwaZulu-Natal, South Africa.

Overview
The school has ±216 boarders and 1200 day pupils. There is a house system consisting of 10 houses. A peer counselling programme began in 1996.

The school motto is Cheerfulness with Industry.

History
The school was founded in 1920 in the family mansion of Morningside, the home of Peter and Mary Davis. In 1925, Morningside became the boarding establishment. The main school building, designed after the style of Sir Herbert Baker, is now a National Monument.

Sport
A full programme of sporting activities is available. Facilities include:

3 Hockey fields
10 Tennis courts
4 Tennis practice walls
4 Netball fields
Heated Swimming pool
2 Squash courts
Artificial Surface Hockey Field
Sylvia Vietzen Community Centre:
Indoor hockey
Basketball
Volleyball
Netball
Badminton
Soccer

Campus
The  estate has developed into a complex of school buildings, trees, gardens and playing fields.

There is also a boarding facility that houses about 210 girls from Grade 8 to Grade 12 on the estate.

Awards and honours
The school is ranked as one of the top three schools in its district for achievements in the ‘Matric’ Examination (South African National Senior Certificate). The school was also recently named one of the Top 25 Government Schools in South Africa.

Achievements include:
2007 – National Science and Technology Forum Award for excellence in Mathematics and Science
2007 – Life-Sciences Olympiad: GHS was the top achieving school in the Grade 11 section
2006 – Umgungundlovu Director’s Special Achievement Award for the best Senior Certificate results in the District for 2001–2005
2006 – Presidential Award for Excellence in SC Mathematics - sponsored by Anglo-American
2006 – National Science and Technology Forum Award for excellence in Mathematics and Science

Old Girls' Society
The school has a very active old girls society with events held continuously.

Notable alumnae
Judy Ditchfield, actress 
Kathleen D. Gordon-Gray, botanist, plant collector and educator
Thuso Mbedu, actress
 Sibusisiwe Jili, actress

References

External links
Pietermaritzburg Girls' High School official site

Boarding schools in South Africa
Schools in KwaZulu-Natal
Educational institutions established in 1920
Girls' schools in South Africa
1920 establishments in South Africa
High schools in South Africa
Pietermaritzburg